The Annobón dwarf gecko (Lygodactylus thomensis) is a species of gecko. It is only found on a number of islands or islets in the Gulf of Guinea, specifically Annobón (Equatorial Guinea), Príncipe, São Tomé, and Ilhéu das Rolas (São Tomé and Príncipe).

References

Lygodactylus
Reptiles of Equatorial Guinea
Fauna of Annobón
Vertebrates of São Tomé and Príncipe
Reptiles described in 1881
Taxa named by Wilhelm Peters